Language: An Introduction to the Study of Speech is a seminal book by Edward Sapir in which the author offers an introduction to his ideas about language.

References

External links 
Language: An Introduction to the Study of Speech
1921 non-fiction books
Linguistics textbooks
Harcourt (publisher) books
Anthropological linguistics